Midland Commando was a light infantry regiment of the South African Army. It formed part of the South African Army Infantry Formation as well as the South African Territorial Reserve.

History

Origin
This unit was originally named Fort Beaufort Commando.

Operations

With the SADF
The unit was renamed in 1962. The unit was located in Grahamstown. 

The area covered by this unit included Alexandria, Albany, Bathurst, Craddock, Fort Beaufort, Keiskammahoek, Pearston, Peddie and Somerset East. 

By 1968 the area of the Midland Commando was reduced to the magisterial district of Albany, Alexandria and Bathurst.

During this era, the unit was mainly used for area force protection, search and cordones as well as stock theft control assistance to the local police.

Association with the Winterberg Commando
The Winterberg Commando was founded in Adelaide in 1948. That units area of responsibility was significantly large on the outset, and two further commandos namely Katberg and Midland Commandos were developed.

With the SANDF

Disbandment
This unit, along with all other Commando units was disbanded after a decision by South African President Thabo Mbeki to disband all Commando Units. The Commando system was phased out between 2003 and 2008 "because of the role it played in the apartheid era", according to the Minister of Safety and Security Charles Nqakula.

Unit Insignia

Leadership

References

See also 
 South African Commando System

Infantry regiments of South Africa
South African Commando Units